Icel may refer to:

 İçel, former name of Mersin Province, Turkey
 Icel of Mercia (fl. 510–535), an early king of Mercia
 International Commission on English in the Liturgy (ICEL)